Willow Tree was a Main Line Long Island Rail Road station that was opened on the north side of the tracks and the west side of 183rd Street, then known as Hamilton Street. It was located in what is today the Hollis section of Queens, New York City.

History
Willow Tree station opened on March 1, 1837, when Long Island Rail Road service opened to Hicksville. Willow Tree can be found in timetables as early as October 1, 1852, and as late as November 4, 1867. In the year ending June 30, 1861, 75,650 quarts of milk were received from the Willow Tree station. 

An 1868 book says that only the Sunday excursion trains, and the North Islip and Hempstead passenger trains regularly stop there. On Friday April 23, 1869, on the eve of the Long Island Rail Road's 35th anniversary, a three car train, pulled by Thurlow Weed, hit a broken rail and derailed just east of Willow Tree at 187th Street, Hollis. Six people died and 14 people were seriously injured.

There was no depot building, but there was a dwelling house located close to the track which was fitted with a seat fixed on the outside for the use of waiting passengers. An African-American family occupied the house in the late 1860s and early 1870s, and when several came down with smallpox in 1873, the place was quarantined. In September 1871, President Charlick of the Long Island Rail Road decided to abandon the station, and the station is last listed in June 1872. However, on a track map its closure is listed as 1880. After its closure it was superseded by the Rockaway Junction station. Since 1991, the site of the Willow Tree station has been occupied by the present site of the platforms for the Hillside Facility over the 183rd Street bridge.

References

Former Long Island Rail Road stations in New York City
Railway stations in Queens, New York
Railway stations in the United States opened in 1837
Railway stations closed in 1872